"St. Brendan's Voyage" is a modern Irish folk song, written by Christy Moore, and released on his 1985 album Ordinary Man. The song relates the legendary journey of Saint Brendan in a comic and fanciful way.

The Narrative

The body of the song consists of four eight-line verses, each followed by a four-line chorus. 

It opens, however, with a four-line expository verse which establishes the year of the narrative as 501 A.D., and suggests that Brendan's motivation for leaving was that he was "tired of thinning turnips and cutting curly kale."

The first full verse seems to establish a heroic tone, claiming that "of all the navigators, St. Brendan was the best." But it quickly turns comic, offering that Long Island was discovered, and America "put... on the map" as a result of Brendan stopping to purchase candles. He is then given credit for "finding" Honolulu, Australia, China, and Japan. Finally, the listener learns that the eponymous voyage is in fact Brendan's return to Ireland at the age of 70. His traveling companion, an albatross, is also introduced; the bird is subsequently mentioned in each chorus.

The second verse deals with his arrival in County Kerry, where he "clear[s] through customs," and visits Dingle, Ballyferriter, the Conor Pass, and finally Brandon.

The third verse portrays his homecoming celebrations, for which "the entire population came," "the fishermen hauled up their nets, [and] the farmers left their hay." However, the festivities turn sour when Brendan announces that he intends to marry-- "to seek a wife so late in life, and him a total wreck."

In the final verse, a chagrined Brendan returns to the sea—and to the albatross, who has been waiting for him on the island of Inishvickillane and greets him with "'tis great to see you, boss."

Cover versions

In 1993, it was covered by Four to the Bar, on Four to the Bar (EP).

External links
 Lyrics on Christy Moore's website

1985 songs
Songs written by Christy Moore